Lingewaal is a former municipality of the Netherlands.

On 1 January 2019, it merged with Geldermalsen and Neerijnen to form the new municipality of West Betuwe.

Population centres 
Asperen
Herwijnen
Heukelum
Spijk
Vuren

Topography

Dutch topographic map of the municipality of Lingewaal, June 2015

References

External links

Official website

West Betuwe
Former municipalities of Gelderland
States and territories established in 1986
Municipalities of the Netherlands disestablished in 2019